Ego is the third album by the American jazz fusion group The Tony Williams Lifetime, led by drummer Tony Williams. It was recorded during February and March 1971, and was released later that year by Polydor Records. On the album, Williams is joined by guitarist Ted Dunbar, organist Khalid Yasin, bassist and cellist Ron Carter, and percussionists Don Alias and Warren Smith. Jack Bruce also provides vocals on one track.

Tracks from Ego were reissued as part of the 1997 compilation Spectrum: The Anthology.

Reception

In a review for AllMusic, Stewart Mason called the album "easily the weirdest record the Tony Williams Lifetime ever released," and wrote: "Ego is an experimental blend of post-hard bop jazz and the spacier end of psychedelic rock... parts of the album sound like Atom Heart Mother-era Pink Floyd."

Writing for Jazz Times, Giovanni Russonello commented: "Williams was a master at harnessing the tides of change; with Ted Dunbar in the guitar chair, Ego boasts a buoyant, slow-burning grace that was new to Lifetime... Not to be overlooked are the album’s three percussion-only showcases."

A reviewer for The Jazz Shelf stated: "Replacing the blistering improvs of Emergency and Turn It Over is a more reserved patchwork of moods." However, he noted: "Only a few moments really do anything for me, and the other moments sound confused. Taking the horrible cover art and liner essay into account, it's as if Williams was trying to make a hip Artistic Statement. This ace drummer wasn't cut out for that."

Drummer and author Questlove praised the song "There Comes a Time," writing: "The process dramatized in this song, the process of leaving behind modal jazz, is also the process of leaning into something else, even if that something else is not yet known. Every time there comes a time, it is both a time for ending and a time for beginning."

The authors of The Penguin Guide to Jazz Recordings noted that, in relation to Turn It Over, the album represented "a sharp move towards a more percussion-oriented sound." They remarked: "Dunbar's guitar-playing was much more linear and blues-based than McLaughlin's, and Ron Carter's bass work provided a more solid spine than Bruce's blub-a-lib slurs."

Track listing

 "Clap City" – 0:54
 "There Comes a Time" – 5:54
 "Piskow's Filigree" – 3:52
 "Circa" – 6:27
 "Two Worlds" – 4:26
 "Some Hip Drum Shit" – 1:31
 "Lonesome Wells (Gwendy Trio)" – 7:29
 "Mom and Dad" – 5:42
 "The Urchins of Shermêse" – 6:25

Personnel 
 Tony Williams – drums, vocals
 Ted Dunbar – guitar
 Khalid Yasin – organ
 Ron Carter – bass, cello
 Don Alias – percussion
 Warren Smith – percussion
 Jack Bruce – vocals (track 5)

References

1971 albums
The Tony Williams Lifetime albums
Polydor Records albums